Fodina sumatrensis is a noctuoid moth in the family Erebidae, subfamily Erebinae (formerly Noctuidae; Catocalinae). It is found in Peninsular Malaysia, Sumatra, and Borneo mostly in lowlands.

References

Calpinae
Moths of Borneo
Moths of Sumatra
Moths of Malaysia
Moths described in 1924